Anima - Glen Ellyn Children's Chorus is a chorus based in Glen Ellyn, Illinois, a suburb of Chicago. Formerly the Glen Ellyn Children's Chorus (GECC), the chorus changed its name to Anima in May 2008.

History
The chorus was founded in 1964 as the Glen Ellyn Children's Theater Chorus by Barbara Born. Dr. Doreen Rao served as Director from 1972-1988, when the chorus received many of its Grammy awards. Emily Ellsworth served as Artistic Director from 1996-2018. Dr. Charles Sundquist served as Artistic Director from 2018-2022. William Buhr has served as Principal Accompanist since 1984. Evan Bruno began serving as Artistic Director in 2022. 

The chorus has performed frequently with the Chicago Symphony Orchestra at Chicago's Symphony Center, the Ravinia Festival, the 
Grant Park Music Festival and New York's Carnegie Hall. It has participated in four Grammy Award-winning recordings with the CSO and performed under renowned conductors including Sir Georg Solti, Christoph Eschenbach, Claudio Abbado, James Levine and James Conlon. Recently a small number of singers participated in the Lyric Opera. It has toured throughout the United States as well as internationally to Canada, Europe, Australia, Brazil, China, South Africa, England, Spain,  Morocco, and Greece. They were scheduled to tour to Norway in the summer of 2020, but the trip was postponed because of the COVID-19 pandemic. The Touring Chorus plans to tour to the United Kingdom in 2023.

Ensembles included in the Anima-GECC curriculum include KidSingers (conducted by Evan Bruno), Treble and Treble Plus Chorus (conducted by Monica Bertrand), Concert Chorus (conducted by Monica Bertrand), and Touring Chorus (conducted by Evan Bruno).

Choirs of children
Musical groups established in 1964
1964 establishments in Illinois